Warren Welliver (1920-2007) was judge on the Supreme Court of Missouri from 1979 until 1989.  As a judge, he established Comparative Negligence as a defense in civil tort lawsuits, overruling the older Contributory Negligence standard.  Judge Welliver was also famously passed up for Chief Justice; traditionally the judges take turns in the two-year job but Welliver was bypassed for the position.  Judge Welliver was also known for his strong stances in favor of protecting a criminal defendant's rights at trial, and his opposition to the Missouri Plan.

Sources

1920 births
Judges of the Supreme Court of Missouri
2007 deaths
University of Missouri alumni
20th-century American judges
People from Butler, Missouri